Senior Discount is an American punk rock band (with pop-punk tendencies) based out of Providence, Rhode Island, United States. In addition to playing music, the band is involved in film and podcasts.
The band consists of Chuck Staton on vocals and guitar, Abe Correia on bass and back-up vocals, Matt Kelley on lead guitar and back-up vocals, and Christian Staton playing the drums.

Senior Discount claims to have played over 250 shows in the New England Area with Sum 41, Gym Class Heroes, Less Than Jake, Anti-Flag, The Ataris, Leftöver Crack, Girl Talk, The Street Dogs, Monty Are I, Big D and the Kids Table, Brain Failure, Catch 22, Darkbuster, The Swingin Utters, Rehab, Streetlight Manifesto, The Loved Ones, Badfish, Whole Wheat Bread, Suburban Legends, Patent Pending, The Toasters, The Pilfers, The Pietasters and more.

Lead singer Chuck Staton has also played solo acoustic shows with Chuck Ragan (Hot Water Music/The Revival Tour), Dave Hause (The Loved Ones), Kris Roe (The Ataris) and more.

Albums
 There Were Four Who Tried - Senior Discount's debut album (August, 2006)
 ...And That's Goodbye - an EP (May, 2009)
 Is This the End? - an EP (Dec, 2012)
 ...And That's Goodbye (Deluxe) - a deluxe re-released EP (June, 2017)
 "The Christmas Medley" - a single (December, 2017)
 The Best Revenge - an LP (July, 2018)

Videos and film
"VBW Attack: The Senior Discount Movie" - Senior Discount's full-length documentary (with elements of pranks and stunts) released September 2008
"Senior Discount's Holiday Collection" DVD - A collection of Senior Discount's holiday-based short videos, released exclusively at a Senior Discount Christmas concert
Senior Discount continually produces their own comedic web series (and occasional sketches), based around the exploits of the band, and previously posted the videos on DailyMotion.com and FunnyorDie.com, but now features them on YouTube.
They've also self-produced various concert performance videos, update/announcements videos, and short videos on YouTube.

Senior Discount's lead singer Chuck Staton is an active independent filmmaker. He produces film projects for Senior Discount, The Chuck and Brad Podcast, other independent entities, and the podcast Tell 'Em Steve-Dave! (featuring Brian Quinn of Impractical Jokers as well as Walt Flanagan and Bryan Johnson of Comic Book Men). Tell 'Em Steve-Dave! has featured Senior Discount's music on numerous occasions.

Podcast
Senior Discount lead-singer Chuck Staton does a semi-weekly podcast with Senior Discount video star Brad Rohrer. The podcast focuses on the personal lives of the two men, as well as "behind the scenes" about the band, and current movies, games, books and music.

The podcast largely revolves around the music scene that surrounds Senior Discount, and members of Bowling for Soup, Reel Big Fish, and Less Than Jake have appeared on the show with in-depth, in-person interviews. Members of Tsunami Bomb, Homeless Gospel Choir, and more have also appeared on the show. Other guests include Jeff Tremaine (Jackass (franchise)), Casey Jost (Impractical Jokers), JT Habersaat, and more.

Bands local to Providence / New England often appear on the show, including members of The Copacetics, Ten Cents Short, Bad Larry, No Plateau, Nobody's Boyscout, The Down and Outs, Lemon Lime Tennis Shoes, SoundOff, Survivors of the Kraken, The Candace Brooks Band, Short Handed Goal, Sweet Babylon, Bi-Anal Ham Sandwich, Frank Sinatra Jr, The Pogs, Turning Blue, Run for Covers, Scratch and Bang, and more.

Reviews
AbsolutePunk.net – "Every track from the album is an anthem to punk rock’s principles" (about Senior Discount's debut album, There Were Four Who Tried...)
The Noise (Boston) - "This DVD is gold and that the band and those with them have some mighty winds at their sails." (about Senior Discount's documentary, VBW Attack!)
Maximum RockNRoll (California) - "These guys can rock and scream...a strong full-length." (about Senior Discount's album, There Were Four Who Tried...)
Rock Is Life.com - "I was quite surprised, no shocked, at how great the latest release by Rhode Island’s Senior Discount was. This punk rock affair comes at you hard and heavy and never lets up till the very end." (about Senior Discount's album, There Were Four Who Tried...)
Punk Online.co.uk – "An excellent album." (about Senior Discount's label debut, The Best Revenge)
Behind Second Lines – "Senior Discount's new album should be blasted-full volume on the way to the beach! Don't sleep on this band or this album." (about Senior Discount's label debut, The Best Revenge)
Breaking and Entering – “…Simple, yet effective melodies with hard driving guitars…undeniably the right formula.” (about Senior Discount's label debut, The Best Revenge)
Dying Scene – “Honest, emotional, crazy, and fun punk rock!” (about Senior Discount's label debut, The Best Revenge)
The Punk Site – “Senior Discount have an across-the-board appeal that few can match.” (about Senior Discount's label debut, The Best Revenge)

Awards and notable accomplishments
Best Punk/Garage Act - Providence Phoenix 2007 Best Music Poll 
Best Punk/Garage Act - Providence Phoenix 2008 Best Music Poll 
Semi-Finalists - 95.5 WBRU Rock Hunt 2008 
Winner: Best Comedy - Indie Gathering Film Festival (for Senior Discount's documentary, VBW Attack!)
G4 bought footage from Senior Discount's film VBW Attack! and started airing the clips in early 2009
Best Pop-Punk Band - Motif 2017 Motif Music Awards 
Senior Discount's song "Afterlife" opened the film Tell 'Em Steve-Dave!: Live at the Gramercy Theatre 
Best Pop-Punk Band - Motif 2018 Motif Music Awards 
In June 2018, the band got signed to Paper + Plastick Records by Vinnie Fiorello from Less Than Jake

References

External links
Official Website

American punk rock groups
Musical groups from Rhode Island